Make It Snappy was a musical revue that ran for 96 performances at the  Winter Garden Theatre in the 1922–23 Broadway season. It ran from 13 April to 1 July 1922.
It starred Eddie Cantor, who introduced the hit songs "Yes! We Have No Bananas" and "The Sheik of Araby".

Production

Harold R. Atteridge and Eddie Cantor wrote the book. Harold Atteridge wrote the lyrics to music by Jean Schwartz.
Alfred Bryan and William B. Friedlander wrote additional lyrics, and Friedlander wrote additional music.
The show was produced by The Winter Garden Company, with production supervised by Jacob J. Shubert and staged by Jesse C. Huffman.
Louis Gress was musical director. Dell Lampe orchestrated the music and Allan K. Foster staged the musical numbers.

The show ran at the Winter Garden from 13 April 1922 to 1 July 1922. 
Eddie Cantor headlined with Nan Halperin, J. Harold Murray and Lew Hearn.
Shubert sent the show on tour after it had closed on Broadway. In Philadelphia, in the last week of the tour, Cantor introduced the song Yes! We Have No Bananas, written by Frank Silver and Irving Cohn.
The song, later recorded by Cantor for the Victor Talking Machine Company, became the most popular novelty hit of the 1920s.

Synopsis

The show has been described as a "collation of froth".
Some material was reused from an earlier Shubert show The Midnight Rounders.
Eddie Cantor played a classic comedy sketch of "Max, the Tailor", a small man having to deal with an unreasonable customer who wanted a belt in the back – and in the end got a different type of belt from the one he expected. Cantor did other sketches as a taxi driver and a very timid police academy candidate.
Cantor premiered the song The Sheik of Araby, lyrics by Harry B. Smith and Francis Wheeler, music by Ted Snyder.
This also became a major hit.

The Eight Blue Devils put on a tumbling act.
Act 2 opened with "Princess Beautiful (A Cleveland Bronner Ballet)".
Ballet had been expected in all shows in the 1916–17 season, but by 1922 they were considered outdated.
The show included various chorus spectacles. In one the girls were all costumed as pink roses.
The girls used the runway to toss ice cream bricks to the audience in the orchestra seats.

Reception

The revue had a respectable run.
It closed in July, as even the most popular New York shows did in the days before air conditioning.
The New York Sun said of Cantor's performance that "Al Jolson now has a rival".

Cast
The full cast was:

Eddie Cantor
Nan Halperin
Salayman Ali
M. T. Bohannon
Cleveland Bronner
Lew Browne
Marie Burke
John Byam
Evelyn Campbell
Carlos and Inez
Nell Carrington
Helen Christie
Molly Christie
Harry Cressey
Betty Dair
Muriel De Forest
Alfred DeLoraine
Rose Devere
Mae Devereaux
The Eight Blue Devils
Flo Evers
Betty Fitch
Lillian Fitzgerald
Elsie Frank
Eva Fuller
Dolly Hackett
Georgie Hale
Lew Hearn
Lebanon Hoffa
Portland Hoffa
Hermose Jose
Marian Joy
Grace Langdon
Mildred Lee
Madeline Levine
Sally Long
Polly Lux
Betty Marshall
Evelyn Martin
Elsie May
Polly Mayer
Dorothy McCarthy
Margaret McCarthy
Peggy Mermont
Gladys Montgomery
J. Harold Murray
Vivien Nolty
Bonna O'Dear
May O'Brien
Joe Opp
Betty Palmer
Cardinal Peaires
Elsa Peterson
Nan Phillips
Chonchita Piquer
Lucille Pryor
Tot Qualters
Queene Queenen
Charlotte Schuette
Ingrid Solfeng
May Sullivan
Margaret Toomay
Marjorie Toomay
Alice Van Ryker
Alice Weaver
Teddy Webb
Vivien West
Margaret Wilson
Vera Zimeleva

References
Notes

Citations

Sources

External links
 

Broadway musicals
1922 musicals
Plays set in New York City